Space Assassin is a single-player roleplaying gamebook written by Andrew Chapman, illustrated by Geoffrey Senior and originally published in 1985 by Puffin Books. It forms part of Steve Jackson and Ian Livingstone's Fighting Fantasy series. It is the 12th in the series in the original Puffin series. There are currently no announced plans to republish the book as part of the modern Wizard series.

Story
Space Assassin is a science-fiction scenario in which the player is an assassin who must fight his way through the mutant cyborgs on the orbiting spaceship of a mad scientist planning to mutating all life on the planet below.

Space Assassin is the second Fighting Fantasy book in the science fiction genre, the first being Starship Traveller. The book places the player on the starship Vandervecken, where a crazed scientist named Cyrus plans to unleash a hideous experiment upon the player's homeworld.

The player must make their way through the labyrinthine Vandervecken, overcoming robots, mutants and other dangerous foes until they finally confronts the scientist. If the player manages to defeat him the planet will be saved and the game will end successfully.

References

External links
 
 
 

1985 fiction books
Fighting Fantasy gamebooks
Books by Andrew Chapman (writer)
Puffin Books books
Space opera gamebooks